USS Florence (SP-173) was a yacht leased from her owner by the U.S. Navy during World War I. She was outfitted as an armed patrol craft, and her owner, Ensign James W. Alker, was named as commanding officer of the yacht and its crew of sixteen. Florence, based out of New York City,  was assigned various duties in the Long Island Sound. Post-war she was reconfigured to her original civilian condition, and was returned to her owner.

A yacht built in Rhode Island 

Florence (No. 173) was built by the Herreshoff Manufacturing Company of Bristol, Rhode Island, as the yacht Quickstep. She was free leased by the Navy for wartime service in late April 1917 and placed in commission on 29 August of that year as USS Florence (SP-173), commanded by her owner, Ensign James W. Alker, USNRF, of New York City.

World War I service 

Florence was assigned to the 3d Naval District for patrol duty in Long Island Sound. During 1918 she also conducted drills, acted as guardship, convoyed submarines out for operations, and set up target ranges for the ships of the fleet.

Post-war decommissioning and disposal 

On 22 February 1919 Florence was placed out of commission and returned to her owner.

References 

  
 Florence (American Steam Yacht, 1903). Also named Quickstep. Served as USS Florence (SP-173) in 1917-1919
 NavSource Online: Florence (SP 173)

Steam yachts
World War I patrol vessels of the United States
Ships built in Bristol, Rhode Island
1903 ships